Erik Turner (born March 31, 1964) is best known as the rhythm guitarist in American glam metal band Warrant.  Turner co-founded Warrant in Los Angeles, California in July 1984 with bassist Jerry Dixon.
Turner was influenced by bands Led Zeppelin and Aerosmith and guitarists Jimmy Page and Joe Perry.

Discography

Solo albums
 Demos for Diehards (1998)

with Warrant
 Dirty Rotten Filthy Stinking Rich (1989)
 Cherry Pie (1990)
 Dog Eat Dog (1992)
 Ultraphobic (1995)
 Belly to Belly (1996)
 Under the Influence (2001)
 Born Again (2006)
 Rockaholic (2011)
 Louder Harder Faster (2017)

Soundtrack appearances

References

1964 births
Place of birth missing (living people)
Adler's Appetite members
American heavy metal guitarists
Living people
Musicians from Omaha, Nebraska
Warrant (American band) members
American male guitarists
20th-century American guitarists